Johnny Shentall (born John George Shentall; 3 September 1978) is a British pop singer. He was first a member of the pop group Boom! before joining another pop group, Hear'Say in 2002. He is married to Steps band member Lisa Scott-Lee.

Career
Shentall first became a member of short-lived pop group Boom! in 2000. They scored one hit single with "Falling" in January 2001. In early 2002, Shentall then joined another pop group, Hear'Say, after winning the auditions as a replacement for Kym Marsh who had left the group. Hear'Say broke up later that year.

Musicals
Shentall has worked extensively in musical theatre, including performing in 2006 as Chuck Cranston in Footloose at the Novello Theatre in London's West End, as well as Hip Hopper and understudy Greaseball in Starlight Express.

Television
He was one of the celebrities that took part in ITV2's CelebAir. His wife, Lisa Scott-Lee, also took part in the programme. They were both ‘sacked’ on 2 October 2008 in a double elimination, as they abandoned their duties as cabin crew to go clubbing in Ibiza, where they were at the time. Shentall has also featured in a Weakest Link Celebrity Couples Special with Scott-Lee; they were voted off 4th.

References

External links

Living people
English male singers
English pop singers
1978 births
21st-century English singers
21st-century British male singers
People from Doncaster